Elos (before 1930: Δουραλί - Dourali) is a village and a former municipality in Laconia, Peloponnese, Greece. Since the 2011 local government reform it is part of the municipality Evrotas, of which it is a municipal unit. The municipal unit has an area of 117.577 km2. The population of the village was 742 people in 2011. It had its own primary school until 2012. The municipality of Evrotas has 5,718 inhabitants. The seat of the municipality of Evrota is in Scala. The inhabitants work as farmers producing oranges and olive oil. The municipal unit has a coastline on the Laconian Gulf. The Evrotas River is west of Elos. The name dates back to ancient times. It is located west of Monemvasia, east of Gytheio and southeast of Sparta.

Mythology
Pausanias mentions a seaside city near Sparta called Helos, whose inhabitants were enslaved and became the helots. Helos was founded by Heleus, the younger son of Perseus. The city was reduced by siege by the Dorians, and their inhabitants became the first slaves of the Lacedemonian state.

Historical population

See also
List of settlements in Laconia

References

Populated places in Laconia